Anoia may refer to:
 Anoia (comarca), one of the basic administrative divisions in Catalonia, Spain, with 114,000 inhabitants
 Anoia (river), a Catalan river mainly within the comarca
 Anoia, Calabria, Italian commune with 2,378 inhabitants